Valley Bridge is a road bridge in Scarborough, North Yorkshire, England. It spans Ramsdale and was built in 1865.

It was first built as Lendal Bridge, York, but it collapsed there and was later brought to Scarborough.

References 

Bridges in North Yorkshire
Buildings and structures in Scarborough, North Yorkshire
Transport in Scarborough, North Yorkshire